Clinical monitoring may refer to:
Monitoring (medicine), the observation of a disease, condition or one or several medical parameters over time
Monitoring in clinical trials, oversight and administrative efforts that monitor a participant's health during a clinical trial

See also 
 Monitoring (disambiguation)